Teresita Lat Castillo also known as Sister Teresing (July 4, 1927 – November 16, 2016) was a Filipino Roman Catholic nun and a visionary  who reported Marian apparitions in Lipa, Batangas, Philippines in the year 1948. These reported apparitions have been the subject of controversy. An initial investigation report in 1951 was signed by six Roman Catholic bishops and declared the Lipa apparitions as "non-supernatural". Despite the local bishop's attempt to re-open the investigation, in 2016 the Congregation of the Doctrine of the Faith upheld the earlier ruling.

Life 
Castillo came from an educated and religious family that may have influenced her interest in religious works. She was the youngest of seven children of former Batangas Governor Modesto Castillo. At the time of the apparitions, Teresita's father was Judge of the Court of Industrial Relations. The Castillos were very influential in Batangas province, Philippines. Castillo celebrated her 21st birthday by "escaping" early in the morning at five from her father's house to enter the Carmelite Monastery of Lipa. Teresita's entrance into the monastery was not well received initially by the family, who tried all means to get her back. Teresita steadfastly refused to return home.

Marian apparitions of 1948

The apparitions of Lipa are said to have occurred in the Philippines to Castillo, a Carmelite postulant. 

Castillo said that around 5:00 p.m. on September 12, 1948, the Feast of the Holy Name of Mary, she saw a vine in the garden shake though there was no wind at all. A woman's voice told her to kiss the ground and return for fifteen consecutive days.

The next day, September 13, Monday, again at five in the afternoon, Castillo returned to the place, knelt down and intended to say the Hail Mary. She had only reached the phrase "full of grace" when again the vine moved. A beautiful lady appeared, a golden rosary hanging on her right hand. The lady's dress was simple and pure white, held at the waist by a narrow cloth belt. Her feet were bare and resting on clouds about two feet above the ground.

On September 14, Tuesday, the first shower of rose petals took place. Some nuns found fresh rose-petals of exceptional sweetness, strewn around their rooms or outside their doors. Meantime, Mother Prioress Mary Cecilia of Jesus decided to consult Alfredo Obviar, auxiliary bishop of Lipa and spiritual director of Carmel. The bishop instructed her to tell Castillo to ask from the Blessed Virgin some proof that the apparition was from heaven. Days, after the first shower of petals, total blindness afflicted the postulant. The prioress heard a voice telling her that the only way Castillo's blindness would be healed was for her to kiss the eyes of the postulant. So, one day in the presence of Obviar, the prioress lifted the veil of Castillo and imparted a kiss on her eyes. Instantly, Castillo's blindness was cured. Obviar doubted no more that the apparitions were heavenly.

In her last apparition to Castillo, the Blessed Virgin identified herself: "I am the Mediatrix of All Grace.." Reportedly, many conversions and healings occurred.

The stress from the investigation resulted in long illness for Castillo, who eventually had to voluntarily leave the convent as she failed to complete the required length of stay for a novice. She later assisted in compiling and transcribing an English-Tagalog dictionary.

The prioress of Carmel, Cecilia Zialcita, was transferred to another convent. On 22 January 1951, Auxiliary Bishop Obviar, the spiritual director of Carmel Lipa, was installed as Apostolic Administrator of the new Diocese of Lucena. Obviar founded the congregation of the Missionary Catechists of St. Therese and in acknowledgment of his great virtue, he has been declared "Venerable".

Position of the Roman Catholic Church
Initially, permission to venerate Mary under the title of Our Lady, Mediatrix of All Grace was granted by then Bishop Alfred Versoza. In 1951 the Philippine church hierarchy declared that there was no supernatural intervention in the reported happenings in Lipa. Verzosa's successor, apostolic administrator Rufino Santos, ordered that no petals be given to anyone by the Lipa Carmelite community and the statue of Our Lady of Mediatrix be withdrawn from public view.

Verzosa, who allowed the apparitions to be publicized and for the Mediatrix to be venerated, was stripped of all administrative duties, remaining a bishop in name only. Though he had used his family's wealth to rebuild the churches and schools of war-torn Lipa, he was accused of mishandling the war reparations and finances of the diocese. He lived in exile at his Vigan home, reduced to rolling tobacco leaves to augment the family income. In January 2013 Gaudencio Cardinal Rosales, Archbishop Emeritus of Manila, opened the diocesan process of the cause of beatification and canonization of Verzosa.

In 1992, Archbishop Mariano Gaviola granted permission to once again display the image of Our Lady, Mediatrix of All Grace. In November 2009 Gaviola's successor, Archbishop Ramon Arguelles created a commission to conduct a new investigation into the apparitions. In an interview, Arguelles said that the "Mediatrix phenomenon is the greatest thing that has ever happened to the church of Lipa." He also mentioned the fervor of the faithful of the diocese and "friendly pressure to declare the apparitioins authentic".

The Carmelite Convent in Lipa, the site of the reported apparitions, is now the subject of major pilgrimages in the Philippines, one attended by the president of Philippines.

According to a new decree dated September 12, 2015, Arguellas approved the apparitions as "supernatural in character and worthy of belief" the apparitions to Teresita Castillo.

However, in May 2016, the Sacred Congregation of the Doctrine of the Faith (CDF) under Cardinal Gerhard Mueller overruled the archbishop and rejected his 2012 decree declaring that the alleged Marian apparitions in Batangas in 1948 were not authentic. Arguelles himself disclosed the ruling by the CDF in an archdiocesan communiqué on May 31. In its decree, the Congregation stated that Pope Pius XII had made a definitive confirmation in 1951 against the supposed apparitions declaring that they "were not of supernatural origin," which the local authority had no authority to overrule.

References

1927 births
2016 deaths
Carmelite spirituality
20th-century Filipino Roman Catholic nuns
21st-century Filipino Roman Catholic nuns
Marian apparitions
People from Batangas
People from Lipa, Batangas
Visions of Jesus and Mary